The 1999 Asian Speed Skating Championships were held between 9 January and 10 January 1999 at M-Wave in Nagano, Japan.

Women championships

Day 1

Day 2

Allround Results

Men championships

Day 1

Day 2

Allround Results

See also 
 Speed skating at the 1999 Asian Winter Games

References
Men's result 
Women's result 

Asian Speed Skating Championships
1999 in speed skating
International speed skating competitions hosted by Japan
Sports competitions in Nagano (city)
Asian Speed Skating Championships